Hyde Park is an unincorporated community and census-designated place (CDP) in Santa Fe County, New Mexico, United States. It was first listed as a CDP prior to the 2020 census.

The CDP is in the northeast part of the county and is bordered to the west by the city of Santa Fe, the state capital, to the east by Santa Fe National Forest, and to the north by Little Tesuque Creek. New Mexico State Road 475 passes through the community, leading southwest  to downtown Santa Fe and northeast to its end at Ski Santa Fe in the Sangre de Cristo Mountains.

Demographics

Education
It is within Santa Fe Public Schools.

References 

Census-designated places in Santa Fe County, New Mexico
Census-designated places in New Mexico